Aquimarina salinaria  is a Gram-negative, aerobic and rod-shaped  bacterium from the genus of Aquimarina which has been isolated from a saltpan in Taiwan.

References 

Flavobacteria
Bacteria described in 2012